Lorisoidea is a superfamily of nocturnal primates found throughout Africa and Asia. Members include the galagos and the lorisids. As strepsirrhines, lorisoids are related to the lemurs of Madagascar and are sometimes included in the infraorder Lemuriformes, although they are also sometimes placed in their own infraorder, Lorisiformes Gregory, 1915.

Classification 

 Order Primates
 Suborder Strepsirrhini
 Infraorder †Adapiformes
 Infraorder Lemuriformes
 Superfamily Lemuroidea: lemurs
 Superfamily Lorisoidea
 Family Lorisidae: lorises, pottos, and angwantibos
 Family Galagidae: galagos
 Suborder Haplorhini: tarsiers, monkeys, and apes

Notes

References

 

.
Mammal superfamilies
Taxa named by John Edward Gray
Taxa described in 1821